Honeymoon Hotel may refer to:

Honeymoon Hotel (1934 film), a 1934 Merrie Melodies cartoon
the American title of Under New Management, a 1946 British musical comedy
Honeymoon Hotel (1964 film), an MGM comedy starring Robert Goulet and Nancy Kwan
 "Honeymoon Hotel" (The Jeffersons), an episode of The Jeffersons
"Honeymoon Hotel", a song from the musical film Footlight Parade

See also
 Isabel Sanford's Honeymoon Hotel, an American sitcom